Rutland House was the name of at least two London houses occupied by the Earls and Dukes of Rutland.
That on Aldersgate Street was leased by playwright Sir William Davenant, who converted a room of it into a private theatre in the 1650s. That in Knightsbridge was a six-acre site until its demolition in the 1830s.

Rutland House, Aldersgate Street
Rutland House on Aldersgate Street, near Charterhouse Square in the City of London, close to Smithfield Market, was leased by the playwright and impresario Sir William Davenant (1606–1668).

In 1656, freshly released from imprisonment, Davenant turned a room of the house into what was, at first, a private theatre performing his own plays. Soon the performances were advertised and semi-open to the public at a cost of 5 shillings a head, a figure that ensured that only persons of quality would be able to attend. The reason for Rutland House being used rather than a conventional theatre was to overcome the laws of censorship which operated in all public places following the closures of all public theatres by the Puritan government of Oliver Cromwell.

The house seems to have been not totally suitable for theatrical use; however, a low narrow hall, or salon, at the rear of the house was adapted for the performances. Rather than sitting in comfort, the audience had to sit on improvised benches, and so confined was the space available that the benches had to be arranged at an angle to the small stage to accommodate the large audiences who came.  The small stage, described by Davenant as a  "Cup-board stage", was adorned with gold and purple curtains.  Above the stage in what was contemporarily described as a "louver hole" was concealed a small orchestra.

Davenant had seen Italian opera sung in Paris; this inspired him to conceive a cunning plan: as the Puritan government had no objection to music, only drama, he obtained permission to stage a performance of his opera  The Siege of Rhodes, to be sung in "recitative music".  Thus, the first English opera was performed at Rutland House in May 1656 , simultaneously overcoming the prohibition of drama.  The Rutland House production also included England's first professional actress, Mrs. Coleman  and was later transferred to the Cockpit Theatre in Drury Lane.

Davenant established at least two other "private performance houses" in Lincoln's Inn Fields and Drury Lane. After Davenant opened more conventional theatres, he continued to use Rutland House to preview new productions, to gauge audience reaction.

Rutland House, Knightsbridge

This was built for John Manners, 3rd Duke of Rutland.

The house stood from the mid 18th century until it was demolished in 1836.

Rutland Gate

Rutland Gate, a double-square of grand houses around two tree-planted narrow communal greens was engineered and erected on its site, save for №s 48C to 65 which come from the land to the west.  Many of its buildings are listed.

References

External links
Penny McIsaac, "Where were plays performed before the opening of the playhouses?"
Rutland House, Knightsbridge from the Survey of London

Opera houses in England
Former theatres in London
Former houses in the City of London
Theatres completed in 1656
Music venues completed in 1656